Yarygin may refer to:

 Vladimir Yarygin, Russian designer of sport pistols and of the MP-443 Grach
 Ivan Yarygin, Soviet wrestler and Olympic champion
 Ivan Yarygin Sports Palace